"Tell Me Why (The Riddle)" is a song by German DJ Paul van Dyk in collaboration with English indie dance band Saint Etienne, with Sarah Cracknell of the group on vocals. Released in May 2000, the song peaked at number seven on the UK Singles Chart, giving both acts their highest-charting UK hit. A music video was made along with the song that can be found on the Global DVD.

Charts

References

2000 singles
2000 songs
Paul van Dyk songs
Saint Etienne (band) songs
Songs written by Bob Stanley (musician)
Songs written by Pete Wiggs
Songs written by Paul van Dyk
Songs written by Sarah Cracknell